Pearsonia cajanifolia is a South African shrublet belonging to the family of Fabaceae, and one of 13 species in the genus, usually herbs or shrublets with woody rootstocks and all occurring in Africa south of the equator with the exception of 1 species found on Madagascar. P. cajanifolia is commonly found in submontane grassland, at altitudes 1350–2100 m, in the South African provinces of Free State, Gauteng, Limpopo, Mpumalanga, and North West, also in Zimbabwe and Malawi.

Description

Gallery

References

Crotalarieae